Ray Kelly was an Australian rugby league footballer who played as a  in the 1950s. He played for Newtown in the New South Wales Rugby League (NSWRL) competition.  He was the brother of Harold Kelly who also played for Newtown in the 1950s.

Early life
Kelly was born in Gunnedah, New South Wales but grew up in Erskineville, New South Wales before being graded by Newtown.

Playing career
Kelly made his first grade debut for Newtown in 1953.  In 1954, Kelly was part of the Newtown side which claimed the minor premiership with the likes of Brian Clay, Kevin Considine and  Ray Preston playing for the club at the time.

Kelly played at five-eighth in the 1954 NSWRL grand final against South Sydney which Newtown lost 23-15.  The following year, Newtown again claimed the minor premiership and reached the 1955 NSWRL grand final against Souths.  Newtown went into the game as favorites as South Sydney were without a few of their star players including future immortal Clive Churchill.  

Kelly played at five-eighth in the game which Newtown led at halftime 8-4 before Souths came back to win a thrilling contest 12-11.  This would be Newtown's last grand final appearance for another 26 years.

Kelly played one further season for Newtown before retiring at the end of 1956.

References

Australian rugby league players
Newtown Jets players
Year of birth missing
Year of death missing
Place of death missing
Rugby league five-eighths
Rugby league players from New South Wales